Labudova pesma (trans. Swan Song) is the eleventh studio album from Serbian and former Yugoslav rock band Riblja Čorba, released in 1992.

Recording and reception
As Yugoslav wars broke out in 1991, the band intended to release Labudova pesma as their last album (and named the album according to their decision), but eventually changed their decision to disband. Album was recorded in Vienna at the end the first year of the wars. On the album recording, the band cooperated with Oliver Mandić. The intention was for Mandić to become an official band member (as the keyboardist), however, due to the fight between Mandić and the band's frontman Bora Đorđević, the cooperation ended and the songs "Vukovar", "Prodavnica snova", "Zbogom pameti", "Šta još možeš da mi daš" and "Na pola puta do sreće" written by and recorded with Mandić were not released on the album. The album was released through the independent record label Samy.

Although Đorđević would soon become an active supporter of the Serbian troops in Republika Srpska and Republika Srpska Krajina, the album included a number of anti-war songs: A cappella "Dok padaju glave", prayer "Amin", and "Rat je završen". Nevertheless, the album's only hit was "Kad sam bio mlad", a cover of Eric Burdon's song "When I Was Young".

Album cover
The album cover was designed by Jugoslav Vlahović.

Track listing

2001 One Records reissue bonus track

Personnel
Bora Đorđević - vocals
Vidoja Božinović - guitar
Zoran Ilić - guitar
Miša Aleksić - bass guitar
Vicko Milatović - drums

Additional personnel
Štefan - keyboards
Fred - guitar, recorded by

References

Labudova pesma at Discogs
 EX YU ROCK enciklopedija 1960-2006,  Janjatović Petar;  
 Riblja čorba,  Jakovljević Mirko;

External links
Labudova pesma at Discogs

Riblja Čorba albums
1992 albums